John Milton (April 20, 1807 – April 1, 1865) was governor of Florida through most of the American Civil War. A lawyer who served in the Florida Legislature, he supported the secession of Florida from the Union and became governor in October 1861. In that post, he turned the state into a major supplier of food for the Confederacy. In his final message to the state legislature as the war was ending, he declared that death would be preferable to reunion with the North. When he killed himself, his son Jefferson Davis Milton was a toddler.

Early and personal life
Milton was the son of a prominent Southern family and a relative of the famed English poet of the same name. A lawyer and politician, he was the governor of Florida through much of the Civil War, being a strong supporter of secession, as well as a slave owner.

He was the son of Homer Virgil Milton (1781–1822), an officer who fought in the War of 1812, and the grandson of Revolutionary War hero, United States presidential candidate of 1789, and former Georgia Secretary of State, John Milton (1756–1804). Born near Louisville, Georgia, John Milton married Susan Cobb († 1842) in about 1830, and they had three children. They lived in Georgia and later in Alabama. He remarried Caroline Howze (1826-1901) from Alabama in 1844; they had two sons and seven daughters.

John and Caroline lived in Alabama, New Orleans, and eventually settled in Marianna (northern Florida). One of their sons was Old West lawman Jeff Milton, and a grandson, William Hall Milton (1864–1942), was a United States senator from Florida in 1908 and 1909.

Career
During his career, Milton became a lawyer, practicing in a number of communities in Georgia and Alabama, before settling in New Orleans. He came to Florida in 1846, and quickly entered the Florida political scene. In 1848, he served as a presidential elector for the state, then in 1850 was elected to the Florida House of Representatives.

American Civil War
As a supporter and enabler of slavery, he was an early advocate for secession of Florida from the Union. He was a delegate to the 1860 Democratic National Convention from Florida and in the same year ran for the office of governor.  A convention was called for to take up the issue of secession and on January 10, 1861, the measure passed.  He took the oath of office on October 7, 1861. During the Civil War, Milton stressed the importance of Florida as a supplier of goods, rather than men, with Florida being a large provider of food and salt for the Confederate Army. As the war drew to a close and the Confederacy was close to defeat, he became worn down by the stress of his office. Governor Milton left Tallahassee for his plantation, Sylvania, in Marianna, Florida.

Death
In his final message to the state legislature, he said that the Northern Army leaders "have developed a character so odious that death would be preferable to reunion with them".

On April 1, 1865, he was found dead of a gunshot wound to the head by his son, William Henry Milton. His death was reported as an accident by his family, church, and the West Florida News. The New York Times assumed Governor Milton’s death to be suicide at the prospect of Union victory and Republican government. The president of the Florida Senate, Abraham K. Allison, was sworn in as governor of Florida later that day.

Governor John Milton is buried at Saint Luke's Episcopal Cemetery in Marianna. The late governor’s remains lie in a Milton family section of the cemetery with 43 gravestones bearing the name.

Like many families of the era, Reconstruction was an economically difficult time for the late governor’s family in  Jackson County, Florida. Milton’ youngest son, Jefferson Davis Milton (1861–1947) moved to Texas, later Arizona. He distinguished himself as a Texas Ranger, police chief of El Paso, and served for over 25 years as America’s first border agent. William Hall Milton (1864–1942), grandson of the governor, was a U.S. Senator from Florida from 1908–1909.

References 

 "The Hatcher-Harris Family Tree," Our Genealogy/History Directory, by Beverly & Bob Whitaker, https://web.archive.org/web/20070416082056/http://home.kc.rr.com/gentutor/
 The John Milton Letter Book, Florida Historical Society, Cocoa, Florida

External links 
 Official Governor's portrait and biography from the State of Florida
 
 

1807 births
1848 United States presidential electors
1865 deaths
19th-century American Episcopalians
19th-century American lawyers
19th-century American politicians
+Families
Confederate States of America state governors
Deaths by firearm in Florida
Democratic Party governors of Florida
American
Firearm accident victims in the United States
Georgia (U.S. state) lawyers
Hunting accident deaths
Democratic Party members of the Florida House of Representatives
People from Jefferson County, Georgia
People from Marianna, Florida
People of Florida in the American Civil War
Sports deaths in Florida